Jordan Murch (born 15 September 1989) is a Scottish footballer who plays for Petershill in the SJFA West Region Premiership. He has previously played in the Scottish Football League First Division for Clyde.

Career

Murch signed a YTS contract with Clyde in July 2007, and signed his first professional contract in May 2008. He made his professional debut in November 2008 against Ross County, when he came on as a substitute in a 3–0 defeat.

He joined Stranraer on loan until the end of the season in January 2009 along with Stephen Connolly. However, the loan was terminated early and he returned to Clyde after only two appearances.

Murch was released by Clyde in June 2009 along with the rest of the out of contract players, due to the club's financial position. He joined Junior side Beith Juniors, then had a spell back at under-21 level before signing for East Kilbride Thistle in March 2010.

In May 2010 Murch crossed the Atlantic to Texas, to play for the DFW Tornados in the USL Premier Development League. He made his debut for the Tornados on 15 May 2010 as a second-half substitute in a game against the West Texas United Sockers, and scored his team's third goal in a 3–0 victory. After Tornados folded at the end of the 2010 season, Murch returned to Scotland and rejoined East Kilbride before moving to Petershill in January 2011.

Murch was called up to the Scotland Junior international squad in October 2012 for their fixture against the Republic of Ireland. He moved on to Irvine Meadow in the summer of 2014, but returned to Petershill two seasons later.

Statistics
Correct as of 16 January 2009

See also
Clyde F.C. season 2007-08 | 2008–09

References

External links

1989 births
Living people
Scottish footballers
Clyde F.C. players
Stranraer F.C. players
DFW Tornados players
Scottish Football League players
Scottish Junior Football Association players
USL League Two players
Beith Juniors F.C. players
Petershill F.C. players
East Kilbride Thistle F.C. players
Irvine Meadow XI F.C. players
Association football forwards
Association football midfielders
Scottish expatriate sportspeople in the United States
Expatriate soccer players in the United States
Scottish expatriate footballers
Scotland junior international footballers